Kim So-yeon (born 21 July 1982) is a South Korean badminton player. She was part of the Korean junior team that won the silver medal at the 2000 Asian Junior Championships, and also clinched the bronze medal in the girls' doubles event. Kim who educated at the Sungji Girls' High School, won the 2000 National High School Championships in the mixed doubles event partnered with Lee Jae-jin. Kim later joined the Masan City team, and had won the title at the 2006 Gyeongnam Badminton Championship.

Achievements

Asian Junior Championships
Girls' doubles

BWF International
Women's doubles

References

External links
 

1982 births
Living people
South Korean female badminton players